HD 151967 is suspected variable star in the southern constellation of Ara. It is a sixth magnitude star, which means it is just visible to the naked eye in dark skies. Parallax measurements place it at a distance of approximately 710 light years from the Earth.

This is a red giant with a stellar classification of M1III; it has expanded to 53 times the radius of the Sun and radiates 637 times the Sun's luminosity. The star varies in brightness by an amplitude of 0.0156 in magnitude over a period of 26 days. The effective temperature of the outer atmosphere is 3,839 K, giving it the ruddy hue of an M-type star.

References

External links
 HR 6251

Ara (constellation)
Suspected variables
M-type giants
Durchmusterung objects
151967
6251
082672